Marios Papadopoulos (born 10 December 1992) is a Greek professional footballer who plays as an attacking midfielder for Football League club Ierapetra.

Career
Marios started his career in Makedonikos youth team. In 2007, he was promoted to the first squad and spend four years playing for the club. During the summer transfer window of 2011 he left Makedonikos to join Pontioi Katerini but he was released from the club the same season, during the winter transfer window. In January 2012, he was signed by Agrotikos Asteras on a free transfer. During season 2012–2013 Marios, was a team regular with Agrotikos Asteras where he played 55 games and scored 17 goals. He got the attention of Veria's scouting team and he was signed in during the summer transfer window of 2014. Marios signed a 3-year contract with the Superleague club. This was the first professional team that he joined.

On 27 September 2014 Marios moved to Aris on loan for one year. Papadopoulos' loan was finished on 30 June 2015 and he returned to Veria.

Marios was also member of the Greece U17 squad during 2010–2011 season.

He was released on a free transfer in January 2015 and he signed a contract with Aris.

Personal life
Marios was born in Naousa, Greece. He is the son of the former football player and coach Alekos Papadopoulos who's the fourth all time goalscorer of Veria.

References

External links
 Myplayer.gr Profile

1992 births
Living people
Greek footballers
Footballers from Naousa, Imathia
Veria F.C. players
Aris Thessaloniki F.C. players
Association football midfielders